Publius Curiatius Fistus Trigeminus was a Roman politician in the 5th century BC, consul in 453 BC, and decemvir in 451 BC.

Family
He was named Publius Curiatius by Livy, but Publius Horatius by Dionysius of Halicarnassus, which nevertheless confirms Livy's as fact. Diodorus Siculus himself only gives Trigeminus. He could have been part of the gens Horatii and not in that of the Curiatii, two gentes that had opposed each other during the Roman monarchy in the fight of the Horatii and the Curiatii.

If he was part of the gens Curiatii, he was the only member of the family to become consul.

Biography

Consulship
In 453 BC, he was consul with Sextus Quinctilius. Rome was ravaged this year by a famine and an epidemic, which killed animals as well as people. It is thought to have been typhus, an epidemic that raged on for ten or more years. His colleague, Varus, and the consul suffect that replaced him both caught the disease that same year.

Decemvirate
In 451 BC, he was part of the First Decemvirate which wrote the ten first tables of the Law of the Twelve Tables.

References

Bibliography

Ancient bibliography
 Livy, Ab urbe condita
  Diodorus Siculus, Universal History,  Book XII, 9 on the site Philippe Remacle
 Dionysius of Halicarnassus, Roman Antiquities, Book X, 1-16, and Book X, 45-63 at LacusCurtius

Modern bibliography
 

 
 

5th-century BC Roman consuls
Ancient Roman decemvirs
Curiatii